The Scott Glacier  is a major glacier,  long, that drains the East Antarctic Ice Sheet through the Queen Maud Mountains to the Ross Ice Shelf.  The Scott Glacier is one of a series of major glaciers flowing across the Transantarctic Mountains, with the Amundsen Glacier to the west and the Leverett and Reedy glaciers to the east.

Geography
The Scott Glacier originates on the Antarctic Plateau in the vicinity of D'Angelo Bluff and Mount Howe, and descends between the Nilsen Plateau and the mountains of the Watson Escarpment to enter Ross Ice Shelf just west of the Tapley Mountains.

The Tapley Mountains, Watson Escarpment, Mount Blackburn, and the La Gorce Mountains bound the Scott Glacier on its eastern margin, while the Karo Hills, Hays Mountains, Faulkner Escarpment, and Rawson Mountains define the western edge of the Scott's drainage.

History
Scott Glacier was discovered in December 1929 by the Byrd Antarctic Expedition geological party under Laurence Gould.  The Scott Glacier was named by the Advisory Committee on Antarctic Names (US-ACAN) after early Antarctic explorer Robert Falcon Scott, who never saw the Scott Glacier but rather ascended the Beardmore Glacier to the west en route to the South Pole in 1911–12. It was first ski traversed in January 1990 by Martyn Williams (Canada, the leader and guide) and Jerry Corr (USA) traveling from the South Pole to the Ross Ice Shelf and then by Mike McDowell (Australia) in 1992, on a ski traverse from the South Pole to the coast. Thus Williams and Corr were the first people to traverse Antarctica under human power as described in the book The Snotsicle Traverse by Jerry Corr.

See also
 List of glaciers in the Antarctic
 List of Antarctic ice streams
 Sunny Ridge

References

Further reading

Queen Maud Mountains
Ice streams of Antarctica
Glaciers of Amundsen Coast
Gould Coast